Ꝥ (minuscule: ꝥ), or Þ (thorn) with stroke was a scribal abbreviation common in the Middle Ages. In Old English texts, the stroke tended to be more slanted, while in Old Norse texts it was straight. In Middle English times, the ascender of the þ was reduced (making it similar to the Old English letter Wynn, ƿ), which caused the thorn with stroke abbreviation to be replaced with a thorn with a small t above the letter.

A thorn with a stroke on the descender also exists, used historically as an abbreviation for the word "through".

References

 
 
 Andrew West, What's that?, an article about the proposal to add medievalist characters to the UCS
 Unicode Character 'Latin capital letter thorn with stroke' (U+A764)
 Unicode Character 'Latin small letter thorn with stroke' (U+A765)

Latin-script letters